Joanne King (born 20 April 1983) is an Irish actress. She played Cynthia 'Cyd' Pyke on the BBC One hospital drama Casualty and Jane Boleyn, Viscountess Rochford in the Showtime 2007 - 2010 series The Tudors.

Private life
King was born in Dublin, the second of four children. Her father Ronan is an accountant and mother Edel is a volunteer teacher. She attended St. Brigid's Girls School in Cabinteely and St Joseph of Cluny Killiney. She trained at the Gaiety School of Acting, Dublin.

Career
She moved to London from Ireland and was working as a BBC tour guide when she auditioned for a role on Casualty. She is played Cyd (Cynthia Pyke) on Casualty. 

She later played Anne Boleyn's sister-in-law, Lady Jane Rochford, in Showtime's The Tudors. Her character first appeared in the middle of Season Two in a small supporting role; this was expanded for the fourth and final season, which portrayed the downfall and execution of Lady Jane.

Charity efforts
She opened a cafe in Bristol, which enables all profits to go to the Tenovus Cancer Care charity, which funds cancer care and research.

TV/film roles
Striking Out (TV Series) (2017) as Ada O'Melia 
Angel of Decay (2016) as Sande 
Massive (2008) as Nancy
The Tudors (2008–2010) (seasons 2-4) as Jane Boleyn, Viscountess Rochford
Trial & Retribution (Kill the King -Part 2 : 2008) -
Shameless (2008) as Brandi
The Omid Djalili Show (2007)
Casualty (2006–2007) as Cynthia 'Cyd' Pyke
The Exile Files (2006) as Lucy Dillon
Boy Eats Girl (2005) as a zombie

Stage roles
A Midsummer Night's Dream - 2005 - Hermia - The Pavilion Theatre
Hamlet - 2004 - Ophelia - The Cork Opera House
Carolling Corlorans - Various characters- The Ark/Mermaid Theatre
The Playboy Of The Western World - Honour Blake - Cork Opera Hs
G.S.A. Showcase - Various characters - The Gate
What The Dead Want - Common Girl - The Project
The Abduction Of Persephone - Sharon - G.S.A.

Other work/skills
Appeared in the Brian McFadden music video Irish Son as a businesswoman.
Movement (Adrianne Browne), Stage Combat (Paul Burke), Mime (Sharon O'Doherty), Basic Irish & French, Basic Violin.
Radio: Romeo & Juliet, "Juliet", Arklight Theatre Company
Dance: Modern Dance, Tap, Ballet (Diane Richardson) Accents: Regional Irish, English, RP, Various American
Singing: Alto

Voice over
Forza Horizon 3 (Video Game) as Keira Harrison.
Forza Horizon 4 (Video Game) as Keira Harrison.
Dragon Age: Inquisition (Video Game)
The Secret World (Video Game) Moutemouia

References

External links

 Daily Mirror interview with Joanne King 24 March 2007.
 Joanne King, Ex-cast profile on Casualty

1983 births
Irish film actresses
Irish stage actresses
Irish television actresses
Living people
Actresses from Dublin (city)